Endotricha suavalis is a species of snout moth in the genus Endotricha. It was described by Pieter Cornelius Tobias Snellen in 1895, and is known from Java, Indonesia.

References

Moths described in 1895
Endotrichini